The sixth season of Dexter premiered on October 2, 2011, on the television cable network Showtime, and consisted of 12 episodes. The season follows Dexter's and Miami Metro's investigations into a string of bizarre ritualistic killings featuring overtly religious apocalyptic symbolism. On November 18, 2011, it was announced that Dexter had been renewed for two more seasons.

Plot 

Angel Batista's younger sister Jamie has become Harrison's babysitter, and Dexter Morgan and Debra visit a Catholic pre-school in hopes of signing Harrison up. Meanwhile,  María LaGuerta is promoted to Captain after blackmailing Deputy Chief Matthews, whose name was on a prostitute's ledger. Vince Masuka is teaching a group of forensic science students, and after his first choice faints at a crime scene, he asks an attractive female student, Ryan Chambers, to become his intern. Masuka eventually fires Ryan when she steals a painted prosthetic hand from the Ice Truck Killer crime scenes, which shows up on an internet auction site. Masuka quickly hires another intern, video game designer and computer programmer Louis Greene, to fix the problem. Greene claims he made the auction page vanish, but was unable to get the hand back.   

LaGuerta and Batista have divorced, but try to remain friends; this is further complicated by Matthews' decision to promote Debra to LaGuerta's vacant lieutenant position instead of Batista. Batista thinks he was passed over due to the feud between Matthews and LaGuerta. LaGuerta continuously thwarts Debra's attempts to make a good first impression as the new lieutenant by giving her the wrong advice; however, Debra makes an independent decision to hire Mike Anderson as her replacement, against LaGuerta's recommendation. 

Joey Quinn proposes to Debra, but she refuses and they break up. Shortly after, Quinn learns of Deb's promotion and surmises that it was her reason for ending their relationship. Quinn begins a long pattern of barhopping, drunkenness, and one-night stands; his unprofessional behavior angers and ultimately endangers Batista, his new partner. 

A new threat appears in Miami in the form of the Doomsday Killers (or DDK), Professor James Gellar and his student Travis Marshall, who seek to bring about the end of the world through killings based on the Book of Revelation. They leave signs of the Apocalypse including the Alpha and Omega or the Four Horsemen as a cryptic tableau at each crime scene. Meanwhile, Dexter learns of  Brother Sam, a former drug addict and murderer who repented and became a minister. He operates a body shop where he employs other ex-convicts, to lead them to crime-free lives.  

Initially believing Sam to be behind the first Doomsday Killer murder, Dexter decides to kill Sam but is quickly proven wrong and finds himself befriending him. However, Brother Sam is murdered by Nick, one of his trusted ex-convicts. Before dying, Brother Sam implores Dexter to forgive his assailant. After confronting Nick, who admits to intentionally killing Brother Sam, Dexter goes against Brother Sam's wish and strangles Nick. 

Dexter learns that the Trinity Killer's wife and daughter have been found dead in Nebraska, which Jonah Mitchell reports was the work of his father, Arthur Mitchell.  Dexter, the only person who knows the Trinity Killer is dead, suspects that Jonah is following in his father's footsteps and goes to Nebraska to kill Jonah, encouraged by a vision of his brother, Brian Moser, the Ice Truck Killer. However, after confronting Jonah, Dexter learns that his sister committed suicide and Jonah killed his mother in a fit of rage, and wants to die out of guilt. Dexter decides to forgive Jonah and leaves him alive to deal with his demons.  

Dexter's investigation of the Doomsday Killers leads him to Travis Marshall. Travis says that all he has done was at the request of Professor Gellar, so Dexter asks Travis to help him kill the professor, thinking if he can save Travis then he can save himself. However, Dexter eventually discovers that Professor Gellar had been killed by Travis three years ago and now exists only in the latter's mind. Travis marks Dexter as "the Beast" and tries to kill him in one of his tableaux, the Lake of Fire, but Dexter escapes and is saved by a passing migrant boat. Finally, Travis kidnaps Dexter's son to use as a sacrifice in his final tableau, thinking that "the Beast" is dead. Dexter rescues Harrison and knocks Travis unconscious. He takes Travis back to the church where Travis carried out his earlier murders, which Dexter has set up as a kill room. 

Meanwhile, Jamie starts dating Louis Greene. Greene wants to impress the police force, especially Dexter, and is revealed to have acquired the prosthetic hand from the Ice Truck Killer case, which he mails to Dexter to mess with him after he badmouths a game about serial killers Louis is designing. Debra refuses to yield to pressure to close the case of the overdose death of a prostitute, eventually discovering that Deputy Chief Matthews was present when the woman died. Matthews is forced to retire after LaGuerta leaks the information. Finally, Debra attends department-ordered therapy sessions after being involved in a shoot-out. During her sessions, she begins to realize that she may have romantic feelings for Dexter. She goes to the church (she knew Dexter was doing forensics there) but winds up walking in on him just as he plunges a knife into Travis' chest, to which Dexter responds, "Oh God".

Cast

Main 
 Michael C. Hall as Dexter Morgan
 Jennifer Carpenter as Debra Morgan
 Desmond Harrington as Joey Quinn
 C. S. Lee as Vince Masuka
 Lauren Vélez as María LaGuerta
 David Zayas as Angel Batista
 James Remar as Harry Morgan

Recurring cast 
 Aimee Garcia as Jamie Batista
 Billy Brown as Mike Anderson
 Josh Cooke as Louis Greene
 Rya Kihlstedt as Dr. Michelle Ross
 Lacey Beeman as Holly Benson
 Germaine De Leon as Nick
 Geoff Pierson as Deputy Chief Tom Matthews
 Brea Grant as Ryan Chambers
 Molly Parker as Lisa Marshall
 Christian Camargo as Brian Moser
 Mariana Klaveno as Clarissa Porter
 Brando Eaton as Jonah Mitchell

Special guest stars 
 Colin Hanks as Travis Marshall
 Edward James Olmos as Professor James Gellar
 Mos Def as Brother Sam

Guest cast 
 Kyle Davis as Steve Dorsey
 Jordana Spiro as Beth Dorsey 
 John Brotherton as Joe Walker
 Kristen Miller as Trisha Billings
 Ronny Cox as Walter Kenney 
 Jamie Silberhartz as Erin Baer
 W. Morgan Sheppard as Father Nicholas Galway

Episodes

Reception 

The sixth season of Dexter received mixed reviews from critics. According to Metacritic, the sixth season of Dexter received "generally favorable reviews" with a score of 63/100 based on 10 critic reviews. It is, however, the lowest rated season of the series on the site, and the only one to average a score that is below 70.   

Martin Chilton of The Daily Telegraph gave the first episode of season 6 a score of 1.5 / 5, writing that "With each season, the quality of a show that once won an Emmy nomination and a Golden Globe for Hall has been sliding."

R.L. Shaffer of IGN wrote of the season that "while this season saw a few new twists and turns...it also handed us a fairly hammy story that tied Dexter to an apocalyptic serial killer." However he goes on to write that "even in its weak moments, Dexter is a fascinating show to watch" and that "the subtle seeds of the show's ultimate conclusion...planted throughout season six, are not only compelling, but the real reason to keep watching."

References

External links 
 
 

 
2011 American television seasons
Christianity in popular culture